Servatur Hotels & Resorts is a Spanish hotel chain based in Gran Canaria, founded in the 1979. The company's business is focused on the holiday hotel sector and currently only operates hotels in Gran Canaria.

Servatur keep growing and currently operate ten hotels and apartment complexes on the island.

Hotels & locations

References

Companies of the Canary Islands
Hotel chains in Spain
Hospitality companies of Spain
Spanish brands